Guzargahi Nur or Gozargah-e-Noor is a district in Baghlan province, Afghanistan. It was created in 2005 from part of Khost wa Firing District.

2014 Baghlan floods 
In the afternoon of 06 June 2014 large flash floods devastated a number of villages in Guzargah-e-Nur district of Baghlan province, in North East Afghanistan. Reports from the Afghan National Disaster Management Authority (ANDMA) say 81 people died due to flood, 35 people were injured, seven seriously who were sent to the provincial hospital for further treatment ...
Hundreds of houses have damaged or destroyed in Yahya, Jeryan, Zeh Wali, Dahte Khasa, Mir Khel, Yahood, Dahnae Gharoo, Deh Qandee, Koree Naw, Jar Ab, Dashte Khakaye Payeen, Khasaye Payeen villages in Guzargahi Nur district according to the Baghlan Provincial Governor and the ANDMA director. Affected people have been taken in by the local community in surrounding villages.

References 

Districts of Baghlan Province
2014 floods in Asia
2014 disasters in Afghanistan